The 2022–23 season is the 121st season of competitive association football in Spain.

National team

Spain national football team

Friendlies

2022–23 UEFA Nations League

2022–23 UEFA Nations League A Group 2

2023 UEFA Nations League Finals

2022 FIFA World Cup

Group E

Knockout stage

UEFA Euro 2024 qualifying

Group A

Spain women's national football team

Friendlies

UEFA Women's Euro

UEFA Women's Euro 2022 Group B

Knockout stage

2023 FIFA Women's World Cup qualification

2023 FIFA Women's World Cup qualification Group H

Cup of Nations

Spain women's national under-20 football team

2022 FIFA U-20 Women's World Cup

Group A

Knockout stage

Final

UEFA competitions

UEFA Super Cup

UEFA Champions League

Group stage

Group B

Group C

Group F

Group G

Knockout phase

Round of 16

|}

Quarter-finals

|}

UEFA Europa League

Group stage

Group C

Group E

Knockout stage

Knockout round play-offs

|}

Round of 16

|}

Quarter-finals

|}

UEFA Europa Conference League

Qualifying phase and play-off round

Play-off round

|}

Group stage

Group C

Knockout stage

Round of 16

|}

UEFA Youth League

UEFA Champions League Path

Group stage

Group B

Group C

Group F

Group G

Knockout Phase

Play-offs

Round of 16

|}

Quarter-finals

|}

UEFA Women's Champions League

Qualifying rounds

Round 1

Semi-finals

|}

Final

|}

Round 2

|}

Group stage

Group A

Group D

Knockout phase

Quarter-finals

|}

Men's football

League season

La Liga

Segunda División

Cup competitions

2022–23 Copa del Rey

Final

Supercopa de España

Final

Copa Federación de España

Women's football

League season

Primera División

Segunda División

Cup competitions

Copa de la Reina

Final

Supercopa de España

Bracket

Final

References

Notes

 
Football
Football
Spain
Spain